Kathej is a village in Mohania block of Kaimur district, Bihar, India. As of 2011, its population was 4,471, in 665 households.

References 

Villages in Kaimur district